Sara Hestrin-Lerner (Hebrew: שרה הסטרין-לרנר) (May 18, 1918 – November 18, 2017) was a Canadian-born Israeli physiologist.

Biography 
Hestrin-Lerner was born in Winnipeg, Manitoba, Canada in May 1918. Aged 14, she emigrated with her parents to the then British Mandate of Palestine (now Israel) in 1932. She studied zoology  and received her doctorate in  pathological physiology from the Hebrew University of Jerusalem. She died in November 2017 at the age of 99.

Awards 
In 1955, Hestrin-Lerner was awarded the Israel Prize, for medical science. Hestrin-Lerner's brother, Shlomo Hestrin, was also awarded the Israel Prize, in exact sciences, in 1957.

References

See also 
 List of Israel Prize recipients

1918 births
2017 deaths
Canadian emigrants to Mandatory Palestine
Hebrew University of Jerusalem alumni
Israel Prize in medicine recipients
Israel Prize women recipients
Israeli Jews
Israeli pathologists
Israeli women scientists
Jews in Mandatory Palestine
People from Jerusalem
Scientists from Manitoba
Israeli physiologists
Women physiologists
Burials at Yarkon Cemetery